

H02A Corticosteroids for systemic use, plain

H02AA Mineralocorticoids
H02AA01 Aldosterone
H02AA02 Fludrocortisone
H02AA03 Desoxycortone

H02AB Glucocorticoids
H02AB01 Betamethasone
H02AB02 Dexamethasone
H02AB03 Fluocortolone
H02AB04 Methylprednisolone
H02AB05 Paramethasone
H02AB06 Prednisolone
H02AB07 Prednisone
H02AB08 Triamcinolone
H02AB09 Hydrocortisone
H02AB10 Cortisone
H02AB11 Prednylidene
H02AB12 Rimexolone
H02AB13 Deflazacort
H02AB14 Cloprednol
H02AB15 Meprednisone
H02AB17 Cortivazol
QH02AB30 Combinations of glucocorticoids
QH02AB56 Prednisolone, combinations
QH02AB57 Prednisone, combinations
QH02AB90 Flumetasone

H02B Corticosteroids for systemic use, combinations

H02BX Corticosteroids for systemic use, combinations
H02BX01 Methylprednisolone, combinations
QH02BX90 Dexamethasone, combinations

H02C Antiadrenal preparations

H02CA Anticorticosteroids
H02CA01 Trilostane
H02CA02 Osilodrostat
H02CA03 Ketoconazole
H02CA04 Levoketoconazole

References

H02